La damnation de Faust (English: The Damnation of Faust), Op. 24 is a work for four solo voices, full seven-part chorus, large children's chorus and orchestra by the French composer Hector Berlioz. He called it a "légende dramatique" (dramatic legend). It was first performed at the Opéra-Comique in Paris on 6 December 1846.

Background and composition history
The French composer was inspired by a translation of Goethe's dramatic poem Faust and produced a musical work that, like the masterpiece on which it is based, defies easy categorisation. Conceived at various times as a free-form oratorio and as an opera (Berlioz ultimately called it a "légende dramatique") its travelogue form and cosmic perspective have made it an extreme challenge to stage as an opera. Berlioz himself was eager to see the work staged, but once he did, he conceded that the production techniques of his time were not up to the task of bringing the work to dramatic life. Most of the work's fame has come through concert performances.

Berlioz read Goethe's Faust, Part One in 1828, in Gérard de Nerval's translation; "this marvellous book fascinated me from the first", he recalled in his Memoirs. "I could not put it down. I read it incessantly, at meals, in the theatre, in the street." He was so impressed that a suite entitled Eight Scenes from Faust became his Opus 1 (1829), though he later recalled all the copies of it he could find. He returned to the material in 1845, to make a larger work, with some additional text by Almire Gandonnière to Berlioz's specifications, that he first called a "concert opera", and as it expanded, finally a "dramatic legend".

He worked on the score during his concert tour of 1845, adding his own text for "Nature immense, impénétrable et fière"—Faust's climactic invocation of all nature—and incorporating the Rákóczi March, which had been a thunderous success at a concert in Pest, Hungary, on 15 February 1846.

Performance history
Its first performance at the Opéra-Comique, Paris, 6 December 1846, did not meet with critical acclaim, perhaps due to its halfway status between opera and cantata; the public was apathetic, and two performances (and a cancelled third) rendered a financial setback for Berlioz: "Nothing in my career as an artist wounded me more deeply than this unexpected indifference", he remembered.

La damnation de Faust is performed regularly in concert halls, since its first successful complete performance in concert in Paris, in 1877; it is occasionally staged as an opera, for the first time in Opéra de Monte-Carlo on 18 February 1893, where it was produced by its director Raoul Gunsbourg with Jean de Reszke singing the role of Faust and Rose Caron, Marguerite. The Metropolitan Opera premiered it first in concert (2 February 1896) and then on stage (the United States stage premiere on 7 December 1906) and revived it in concert at Carnegie Hall on 10 November 1996 (repeated on tour in Tokyo the next year). The company presented a staged production on 7 November 2008, produced and directed by Robert Lepage, with innovative techniques of computer-generated stage imagery that responds to the performers' voices. Filmmaker Terry Gilliam made his opera debut at London's English National Opera in May 2011, directing The Damnation of Faust. The production received positive reviews in the British press. In 2015 the Opéra National de Paris reimagined the role of Faust by assuming the persona of English scientist Stephen Hawking for that role. This version of the work also reinterpreted the metaphysical journey Faust is sent on by Méphistophélès in relation to the Mars One project; portraying the dilemma of man leaving earth to populate Mars. The Paris Opera cooperated with NASA, ESA, CNES. and film companies which produce environmental films for the production of Berlioz's work.

Three instrumental passages, the Marche Hongroise (Hungarian March), Ballet des sylphes, and Menuet des follets are sometimes extracted and performed as "Three Orchestral Pieces from La damnation de Faust."

Roles

Instrumentation
The orchestral score requires:
3 flutes (all doubling piccolo), 2 oboes (second doubling English horn), 2 clarinets (in C/A/B), bass clarinet in B, 4 bassoons
4 horns (in all keys), 2 trumpets in C/D/F, 2 cornets in A/B, 3 trombones, 2 tubas (originally scored for one ophicleide and one tuba)
timpani, snare drum, bass drum, cymbals, suspended cymbal, triangle, tamtam, bell (sounding D, F, A, or C)
2 harps
strings: 15 violins I, 15 violins II, 10 violas, 10 violoncellos, 9 double basses

Synopsis

Part I

The aging scholar Faust contemplates the renewal of nature. Hearing peasants sing and dance, he realizes that their simple happiness is something he will never experience. An army marches past in the distance (Hungarian March). Faust doesn't understand why the soldiers are so enthusiastic about glory and fame.

Part II
Depressed, Faust has returned to his study. Even the search for wisdom can no longer inspire him. Tired of life, he is about to commit suicide when the sound of church bells and an Easter hymn remind him of his youth, when he still had faith in religion. Suddenly Méphistophélès appears, ironically commenting on Faust's apparent conversion. He offers to take him on a journey, promising him the restoration of his youth, knowledge, and the fulfillment of all his wishes. Faust accepts.

Méphistophélès and Faust arrive at Auerbach's tavern in Leipzig, where Brander, a student, sings a song about a rat whose high life in a kitchen is ended by a dose of poison. The other guests offer an ironic "Amen", and Méphistophélès continues with another song about a flea that brings his relatives to infest a whole royal court (Song of the Flea). Disgusted by the vulgarity of it all, Faust demands to be taken somewhere else.

On a meadow by the Elbe, Méphistophélès shows Faust a dream vision of a beautiful woman named Marguerite, causing Faust to fall in love with her. He calls out her name, and Méphistophélès promises to lead Faust to her. Together with a group of students and soldiers, they enter the town where she lives.

Part III
Faust and Méphistophélès hide in Marguerite's room. Faust feels that he will find in her, his ideal of a pure and innocent woman ("Merci, doux crépuscule!"). Marguerite enters and sings a ballad about the King of Thule, who always remained sadly faithful to his lost love ("Autrefois, un roi de Thulé"). Méphistophélès summons spirits to enchant and deceive the girl and sings a sarcastic serenade outside her window, predicting her loss of innocence. When the spirits have vanished, Faust steps forward. Marguerite admits that she has dreamed of him, just as he has dreamed of her, and they declare their love for each other. Just then, Méphistophélès bursts in, warning them that the girl's reputation must be saved: the neighbors have learned that there is a man in Marguerite's room and have called her mother to the scene. After a hasty goodbye, Faust and Méphistophélès escape.

Part IV
Faust has seduced, then abandoned Marguerite, who still awaits his return ("D'amour l'ardente flamme"). She can hear soldiers and students in the distance, which reminds her of the night Faust first came to her house. But this time he is not among them.

Faust calls upon nature to cure him of his world-weariness ("Nature immense, impénétrable et fière"). Méphistophélès appears and tells him that Marguerite is in prison. While awaiting Faust's return, she has given her mother the sleeping potion Faust had previously provided to calm her mother during their nights of love, and used it so often that she has killed the old woman, and now is to be hanged the next day. Faust panics, but Méphistophélès claims he can save her—if Faust relinquishes his soul to him. Unable to think of anything but saving Marguerite, Faust agrees. The two ride off on a pair of black horses.

Thinking they are on their way to Marguerite, Faust becomes terrified when he sees demonic apparitions. The landscape becomes more and more horrible and grotesque, and Faust finally realizes that Méphistophélès has taken him directly into hell. Demons and damned spirits greet Méphistophélès in a mysterious infernal language and welcome Faust among them.

Hell has fallen silent after Faust's arrival—the torment he suffers is unspeakable. Marguerite is saved and welcomed into heaven.

Recordings
Complete recordings include (vocal parts in order: Faust, Marguerite, Méphistophélès):

David Poleri, Suzanne Danco, Martial Singher, Donald Gramm, McHenry Boatwright
Boston Symphony Orchestra, Harvard Glee Club, Radcliffe Choral Society
Conductor: Charles Munch
Recorded: 21–22 February 1954, Symphony Hall, Boston Label: RCA Red Seal Records

Richard Verreau, Consuelo Rubio, Michel Roux, Pierre Mollet
Lamoureux Concert Association Orchestra, .
Conductor: Igor Markevitch
Recorded Salle de la Mutualité, Paris, May 1959 – Label: Deutsche Grammophon

André Turp, Régine Crespin, Michel Roux, John Shirley-Quirk
London Symphony Orchestra and Chorus
Conducted by Pierre Monteux
Recorded Royal Festival Hall, 8 March 1962 – BBC Legends BBCL 40062

Nicolai Gedda, Janet Baker, Gabriel Bacquier, Pierre Thau, Maria Peronne
Orchestre de Paris, Choeurs du Théâtre National de l'Opéra
Conductor: Georges Prêtre
Recorded: October 1969, Salle Wagram, Paris
Label: EMI Classics

Nicolai Gedda, Josephine Veasey, Jules Bastin, Richard Van Allan, Gillian Knight
London Symphony Orchestra and Chorus, Ambrosian Singers and Wandsworth School Boys' Choir
Conducted by Colin Davis
Recorded: Wembley Town Hall, July 1973 – Philips

Kenneth Riegel, Frederica von Stade, José van Dam, Malcolm King
Chicago Symphony Orchestra and Chorus
Conductor: Sir Georg Solti
Recorded: May 1981, Medinah Temple, Chicago
Label: Decca / London
For full details, see La damnation de Faust (Georg Solti recording)

Thomas Moser, Susan Graham, José van Dam, Frédéric Caton
Lyon Opera Orchestra and Chorus
Conductor: Kent Nagano
Audio CD (7 August 1995)
Label: Warner Classics UK / Erato

Keith Lewis, Anne Sofie von Otter, Bryn Terfel, Victor von Halem
Philharmonia Orchestra and Chorus
Conducted by Myung-Whun Chung
Audio CD (11 August 1998)
Label: Deutsche Grammophon

Bryan Hymel, Karen Cargill, Christopher Purves, Gábor Bretz
London Symphony Orchestra and Chorus
Conductor: Sir Simon Rattle
Hybrid SACD (8 March 2019)
Label: LSO Live!

Michael Spyres, Joyce DiDonato, Nicolas Curjal, Alexandre Duhamel
Orchestre Philarmonique de Strasbourg, Les Petits Chanteurs de Strasbourg, Maitrise de l'Opéra national du Rhin
Conductor John Nelson (25-27 IV 2019)
Label Erato Warner classics

Parodies
 The piece "L'Éléphant" (The Elephant) from Camille Saint-Saëns's The Carnival of the Animals (1886) uses a theme from the "Danse des sylphes", played on a double bass.

References

External links 
 
  Libretto
 On Berlioz's Damnation of Faust by Jacques Barzun. Special Disc Jockey Pressing Recorded Autumn 1954
 La damnation de Faust 22. Februar – medici.TV – Orchestre National du Capitole – Wiener Singverein – Tugan Sokhiev

1846 operas
Operas based on works by Johann Wolfgang von Goethe
Choral compositions
Compositions by Hector Berlioz
French-language operas
Works based on Goethe's Faust
Opera world premieres at the Opéra-Comique
Operas set in Hungary
Operas
Music based on the Faust legend
The Devil in opera